Oxfordshire County Cricket Club is one of twenty minor county clubs within the domestic cricket structure of England and Wales. It represents the historic county of Oxfordshire.

The team is currently a member of the Minor Counties Championship Western Division and plays in the MCCA Knockout Trophy. Oxfordshire played List A matches occasionally from 1967 until 2004 but is not classified as a List A team per se.

Grounds
The club plays matches at Banbury CC, Great & Little Tew, Challow and Childrey, Radley College & Bicester & North Oxford, Aston Rowant and Thame. There are plans to expand this range of venues. Oxfordshire County Cricket Club is an integrated part of the Oxfordshire Cricket Board.

Honours
 National Counties Championship (5) - 1929, 1974, 1982, 1989, 2021; shared (0) - 
 NCCA Knockout Trophy (0) -

Earliest cricket
Cricket probably reached Oxfordshire by the end of the 16th century.  Although "not cricket", a 1523 reference to stoolball has been found (see Rowland Bowen's history) re a designated field in Oxfordshire.

The earliest reference to cricket in the county is at the University of Oxford in 1673. Dr Samuel Johnson stated that he played cricket during his time at the university; he was there in 1729 for one year only.

One of the earliest references to cricket in Oxfordshire was in the Reading Mercury on Monday 4 October 1779: "On Tues. Oct 5 at Henley, the County of Berks v the County of Oxford, for £25 a side".  This is the first time we read of an Oxfordshire county team.  Berkshire was rated a first-class team at the time but this was a minor match.

Origin of club
There was a county organisation in 1787, according to Wisden.  Oxfordshire competed in the first two Minor Counties Championship competitions in 1895 and 1896, and an Oxfordshire side also appeared in the competition from 1900 to 1906. The present Oxfordshire CCC was founded on 14 December 1921 and has been a member of the Minor Counties since the 1922 season.

Club history
Oxfordshire has won the Minor Counties Championship five times. It won the title outright in 1929, 1974, 1982, 1989 and 2021.

Oxfordshire has never won the MCCA Knockout Trophy since its inception in 1983 but in recent years has suffered 2 narrow final defeats.

Notable players
See List of Oxfordshire CCC List A players and :Category:Oxfordshire cricketers
The following Oxfordshire cricketers also made an impact on the first-class game:
 Daniel Rowe
 John Arnold
 Jonathan Batty
 Buck Divecha
 Andrew Strauss
 Robert Cunliffe
 Tim Hancock
 Charles Williams, later Lord Williams of Elvel, sometime UK government minister

References

External links
 Oxfordshire Cricket Board site
 Oxfordshire County Cricket Club website
 Minor Counties Cricket Association Official Site

Further reading
 Rowland Bowen, Cricket: A History of its Growth and Development, Eyre & Spottiswoode, 1970
 E W Swanton (editor), Barclays World of Cricket, Guild, 1986
 Playfair Cricket Annual – various editions
 Wisden Cricketers' Almanack – various editions

 
National Counties cricket
History of Oxfordshire
1921 establishments in England
Cricket clubs established in 1921
Cricket in Oxfordshire